Fred Lotterhos Sr. (1900 – January 1954) was a justice of the Supreme Court of Mississippi from January 1953 to January 1954.

In January 1953, Lotterhos, from Hinds County, Mississippi, was appointed by Governor Hugh L. White to a seat on the state supreme court vacated by the death of Julian P. Alexander. Lotterhos himself died in January 1954, at the age of 54, and was replaced on the court by Robert G. Gillespie.

References

1900 births
1954 deaths
People from Hinds County, Mississippi
Justices of the Mississippi Supreme Court